Shirakatsi is an impact crater that is located on the Moon's far side. It is attached to the southern exterior rim of the larger crater Perepelkin, and overlies the northwestern rim of Dobrovol'skiy.

This is a relatively fresh crater that has not been significantly eroded by subsequent impacts. The rim edge is well-defined, and there are some terrace structures along parts of the inner wall. The interior floor is uneven, particularly in the north, where it is covered by a complex of ridges. The only level section of floor is along the southern inner wall. The outer rampart of Shirakatsi has formed a mound of debris in the northwestern half of Dobrovol'skiy's interior.

Views

References

External links
 Digital Lunar Orbiter Photo Number I-136-H3
 Figure 148 in Chapter 5 of APOLLO OVER THE MOON: A View From Orbit (NASA SP-362, 1978) shows an oblique closeup of Shirakatsi and Dobrovol'skiy (although they are not named)

Impact craters on the Moon